Silvia Mezzanotte (born 22 April 1967 in Bologna), is an Italian singer.

Early solo career 
Mezzanotte debuted at the Sanremo Music Festival in 1990 with her song Sarai grande, reaching the 4th place in the Newcomers section.

She went on working with artists like Francesco De Gregori, Mia Martini and Laura Pausini.

First stint with Matia Bazar 
In 1999 she replaced Laura Valente as the lead singer of the famed band Matia Bazar; with them, she took part in three subsequent editions of the Sanremo Music Festival: in 2000 (with Brivido caldo, reaching the 8th place), in 2001 (with Questa nostra grande storia d'amore, ranked #3) and 2002, this time winning the contest with Messaggio d'amore, before embarking on a two-year-long world tour.

Solo career 
In 2004, Mezzanotte left the group to pursue a solo career, resulting in two albums: Il viaggio (2006) and Lunatica (2008).

Reunion with Matia Bazar 
In September 2010, Silvia officially re-entered Matia Bazar: shortly after the announcement, the group's new single, Gli occhi caldi di Sylvie, was released.

In 2012, Matia Bazar participated once again to the Sanremo Music Festival, however their song Sei tu failed to qualify for the final.

In August 2015, amidst the group's tour for their 40th anniversary, tragedy struck as drummer and founding member Giancarlo Golzi died of a heart attack. After a short hiatus, Silvia decided to leave the group again in February 2016.

Current activities 
In fall 2016, Silvia took part in and won Tale e Quale Show (the Italian version of Sing Your Face Off), impersonating several famous singers like Adele, Laura Pausini, Dalida, Mina.

In 2017 she announced her upcoming new album, 5.0; in 2019, her fourth solo album Aspetta un attimo, was released.

Since 2015, Mezzanotte has been teaching singing at her school, The Vocal Academy, in Mazara del Vallo.

Discography

With Matia Bazar
 Brivido caldo (2000)
 Dolce canto (2001)
 Messaggi dal vivo (2002)
 Conseguenza logica (2011)
 Matia Bazar 40th anniversary celebration (2015)

Solo
 Il viaggio (2006) 
 Lunatica (2008)
 5.0 (2017)
 Aspetta un attimo (2019)

Notes

External links
 

1967 births
Musicians from Bologna
Living people
20th-century Italian women singers
21st-century Italian women singers